The 1971–72 Duke Blue Devils men's basketball team represented Duke University in the 1971–72 NCAA Division I men's basketball season. The head coach was Bucky Waters and the team finished the season with an overall record of 14–12 and did not qualify for the NCAA tournament.

Roster

Schedule

References 

Duke Blue Devils men's basketball seasons
Duke
1971 in sports in North Carolina
1972 in sports in North Carolina